"Zindagi Meri Dance Dance" (English: "My Life is Dance Dance") is a Hindi song from the Indian film Dance Dance (1987). The song has a remix version in 2017 film Daddy. The film's director Ashim Ahluwalia wanted to make a tribute to composer Bappi Lahiri, so he worked with Norwegian DJ Olefonken to remix the song. It originally composed by Bappi Lahiri and sung by Alisha Chinai in the film Dance Dance. DJ Olefonken recreated it for 2017 film Daddy. But he retained the original singers' voice.

Music video

1987 version 
It originally composed by Bappi Lahiri and sung by Alisha Chinai.

Mithun Chakraborty was featured in the music video.

2017 version 
Actor Arjun Rampal and Serbian dancer Nataša Stanković were featured in the music video.

References

1987 songs
Hindi-language songs
Indian songs
Alisha Chinai songs
Hindi film songs
Songs with music by Bappi Lahiri
Songs with lyrics by Anjaan